Golzar or Gol Zar may refer to the following places:

Afghanistan
 Golzar, Kabul, village in Kabul Province
 Golzar, Kandahar, village in Kandahar Province

Iran
 Gol Zar, East Azerbaijan, a village in East Azerbaijan Province
 Golzar, East Azerbaijan, a village in East Azerbaijan Province
 Golzar, Hormozgan, a village in Hormozgan Province
 Golzar, alternate name of Goleh Jar, Ilam, a village in Ilam Province
 Golzar, alternate name of Harkabud-e Golzar, a village in Ilam Province
 Golzar, Kerman, a city in Kerman Province
 Golzar, Shushtar, a village in Khuzestan Province
 Golzar, Lorestan, a village in Lorestan Province
 Golzar, North Khorasan, a village in North Khorasan Province
 Golzar, Razavi Khorasan, a village in Razavi Khorasan Province
 Golzar, Tehran, a village in Tehran Province
 Golzar, Hirmand, a village in Sistan and Baluchestan Province
 Golzar Rural District, Kerman Province

See also
 Golzar-e Haddad, a village in Ilam Province
 Golzar-e Mohammad, a village in Isfahan Province
 Golzar-e Olya, a village in Kurdistan Province
 Gulzar (disambiguation)